Happy Can Already! is a Singapore Chinese variety series which is telecast on Singapore's free-to-air channel, Mediacorp Channel 8. It stars Jack Neo, Mark Lee, Wang Lei, Benjamin Tan, Chua Lee Lian & Jaspers Lai as the casts of the series. Happy Can Already! aired from 2 December 2016 to 3 February 2017, every Friday from 12:00pm to 12:30pm.

This was the first non-Mandarin Chinese variety show to be produced on Channel 8 after a 30-year hiatus. This series is primarily targeted at Singaporean elderly as most of them speak Chinese dialects at home.

Plot 
Liang Xi Mei (Jack Neo) and friends will reprise their characters from Comedy Nite, giving viewers an update on their lives since they last appeared on screen in 2003. Liang Xi Mei laments that most of her friends are not around anymore. Her eldest son Robert (Mark Lee) is now married to Mary (Chua Lee Lian) and they have a daughter Ah Girl (Toh Xin Hui). Her second son Albert (Benjamin Tan) is now in university, and Lion King (Henry Thia) has a son called Merlion King (Jaspers Lai).

Each episode will start with a guest performance and interview, before proceeding to the skit segment. Performers in this program include veteran getai singers such as Liu Lingling and Hao Hao. The skit segments will not only revolve around the lives of Liang Xi Mei and friends, but will also feature cameo appearances by Aunty Lucy (Dennis Chew).

Cast

Liang (Xi Mei) family

Other characters

Cameo appearance

Guest performers

Development 
This 10-episode dialect variety series is produced by MediaCorp and J Team, in collaboration with local director Jack Neo and the Ministry of Communications and Information. Through an entertaining format with informational components such as songs and skits, and using a language which seniors are most familiar with, each half-hour episode will reinforce relevant messages including health promotion, active ageing, retirement adequacy and support schemes for seniors (such as PGP and CHAS).

Production started on 15 November 2016.

Music

Promotional events 
The first promotional roadshow was held at Kreta Ayer Square on 14 November 2016 with artistes Jack Neo, Mark Lee, Wang Lei, Benjamin Tan, Jaspers Lai and Hao Hao.
The second roadshow was held at Block 114 Aljunied Ave 2 on 17 December 2016 with artistes Jack Neo, Dennis Chew, Chua Lee Lian, Jaspers Lai and Health Minister Gan Kim Yong.
The third roadshow was held at Kreta Ayer Square on 10 January 2017 with artistes Jack Neo, Mark Lee, Wang Lei, Dennis Chew, Moses Lim, Benjamin Tan and Minister Chee Hong Tat.

Awards & Nominations

Star Awards 2017
It was only nominated for one category,  Best Variety Programme .

See also 
 List of variety and infotainment programmes broadcast by MediaCorp Channel 8
List of MediaCorp Channel 8 Chinese drama series (2010s)
Happy Can Already! 2

References 

2016 Singaporean television series debuts
2017 Singaporean television series endings
Hokkien-language television shows
Channel 8 (Singapore) original programming